New Zealand, according to the gazetteer maintained by Land Information New Zealand has "249 named waterfalls and 31 named rapids". There are perhaps seven named "Bridal Veil", and 17 whose names include "Rere" meaning "to leap or descend". In the North Island only 18 of 130 have non-Māori names (including 5 clustered around Mount Taranaki), but in the South Island only 15 of the 150 named waterfalls (or rapids) have retained their Māori name.

There are disagreements on what constitutes a waterfall. For example, the Browne Falls is claimed by some to be a waterfall with a drop of 800 metres. Other sources describe it as a steep stream with numerous small cataracts.


List of waterfalls

This is a list of notable waterfalls in New Zealand. Many of the highest waterfalls are in Fiordland.

Fiordland

Many of the highest New Zealand waterfalls are in Fiordland National Park in the Southland region of the South Island, and are geographically on the west coast; an area with very high rainfall. Several of the waterfalls empty into fiords off the Tasman Sea: 
falls into Doubtful Sound - Chamberlain Falls, Helena Falls, Lady Alice Falls. 
falls into Milford Sound - Bowen Falls, Stirling Falls.

See also
Water in New Zealand
List of waterfalls

References

Notes

Bibliography

Further reading

External links 
Waterfalls in New Zealand at Te Ara: The Encyclopedia of New Zealand
New Zealand Waterfalls Web Site

Waterfalls
New Zealand
Waterfalls